This is a list of Canadian films released in 2017:

See also
 2017 in Canada
 2017 in Canadian television

References

External links
Feature Films Released In 2017 With Country of Origin Canada at IMDb

2017

Canada